Mohammed Hassan may refer to:

 Mohamed Hassan (Libyan musician) (born 1944), Libyan singer
Mohamed Hassan (Egyptian musician) (born 1983), Egyptian singer
 Mohammed Abdullah Hassan (1856–1920), emir of Darawiish monarch Diiriye Guure
 Mohammad Hasan Rahmani (c. 1963–2016), Afghan politician
 Muhammad Hussein Ali Hassan (born 1966), Guantanamo Bay Guantanamo Bay detainee
 Mohammed Mohammed Hassen, a Yemeni Guantanamo detainee
 Mohammed Waheed Hassan (born 1953), Maldivian politician, president of the Maldives
 Mohamad Hasan (politician) (born 1956), Malaysian politician
 Mohamed H.A. Hassan (born 1947), Sudanese scientist
 Mohammad Al Hajj Hassan (born 1976), Lebanese cleric
 Mohammed Hassan Dbouk, Lebanese-Canadian accredited journalist with al-Manar television in Lebanon
 Mohammed Hassan El-Zayyat (1915–1993), Egyptian diplomat and Minister of Foreign Affairs
 Mohammed Awad (died 2007), Iraqi politician, member of Iraqi National Dialogue Council
 Mohammed Hasan Alwan (born 1979), Saudi Arabian short story writer and novelist
 Mohammad Hasan Khan Qajar (1722–1759), chief of the Qoyunlu branch of the Qajar tribe

Sportspeople
 Mohamed Hassan (boxer) (born 1940), Moroccan boxer
 Mohamed Hassan (footballer, born 1985), Egyptian footballer
 Mohamed Hassan (footballer, born 1993), Egyptian footballer
 Mohamed Hassan (swimmer) (born 1972), Egyptian swimmer
 Mohamed Hassan (fencer), Egyptian fencer
 Mohamed Mehdi Hasan (born 1971), Bangladeshi Olympic sprinter
 Haris Mohammed Hassan (born 1958), Iraqi football midfielder
 Abdelilah Mohammed Hassan (born 1934), Iraqi football coach
 Mohammed Hassan (footballer, born 1905) (1905–1973), Egyptian footballer
 Mohammed Hassan Helmy (1912–1986), Egyptian footballer

See also
 Muhammad Hassan (disambiguation)